Events from the year 1862 in Russia.

Incumbents
 Monarch – Alexander II

Events

 
 
  
  
 Congregation of the Sisters of Our Lady of Mercy
 Moscow Yaroslavskaya railway station
 Saint Petersburg–Warsaw Railway
 New Michael Palace

Births
Rosa Pavlovsky de Rosemberg, Russian-born Argentine physician (d. 1936)

Deaths

References

1862 in Russia
Years of the 19th century in the Russian Empire